Yelena Vladimirovna Petushkova (born Moscow 17 November 1940 - died there 9 January 2007) was a Russian and former Soviet equestrian who won three medals, of which one was gold and two silver in dressage during the Summer Olympics.

Biography
Petushkova became a member of the USSR National Team in 1964 and competed for it until 1987. In the 1968 Summer Olympics she won her first silver medal, finishing in second place in the team dressage event alongside Ivan Kalita and Ivan Kizimov. Four years later, in the 1972 Summer Olympics she and her teammates who were again Kalita and Kizimov improved their performance and won the gold medal. In the individual competition she won her third Olympic medal, finishing second behind Liselott Linsenhoff. In between she became World Champion in Aachen 1970 riding her horse Pepel. She became national champion of the Soviet Union a total of thirteen times.

After her career she became vice president of the Soviet Union Olympic Committee between 1983 and 1991, while she was president of the Russian Equestrian Federation from 1996 to 1999 and was the head coach of the Russian National Dressage Team since 1997.

Along with her sports achievements Petushkova also had a highly successful scientific career. After graduating from a secondary school with the gold medal in 1957 she entered the Department of Biology of Moscow State University. She graduated from there with honors in 1963 and after studying in the aspirantura of the Scientific Research Institute of Pharmacology and Medicine by the USSR Academy of Medical Sciences for two years, received Candidate of Biology Sciences scientific degree. Between 1966 and 1976 she was a junior research worker and between 1976 and 1991 - a senior research worker at the chair of biochemistry of the Department of Biology of Moscow State University. In 1991 Petushkova became a senior research worker at the Institute of Biochemistry of the Russian Academy of Science, working there until 1997. She authored more than 60 publications in Soviet and international journals of biochemistry and wrote a monograph "An Introduction to the Kinetics of Enzymic Reactions" in 1982.

Petushkova was awarded the Order of the Red Banner of Labour in 1970, the Order of the Badge of Honor in 1972 and the Order of Friendship of Peoples in 1980.

At the age of 66 she died after long illness.

References

External links
databaseolympics
horsetalk.co.nz
tsr.ch
hln.be

1940 births
2007 deaths
Russian dressage riders
Soviet female equestrians
Russian female equestrians
Russian biochemists
Soviet women scientists
Olympic equestrians of the Soviet Union
Olympic gold medalists for the Soviet Union
Olympic silver medalists for the Soviet Union
Olympic medalists in equestrian
Equestrians at the 1968 Summer Olympics
Equestrians at the 1972 Summer Olympics
Medalists at the 1968 Summer Olympics
Medalists at the 1972 Summer Olympics
Burials in Troyekurovskoye Cemetery
Moscow State University alumni
Soviet biochemists